John Glynn Edwards (2 February 1931 – 23 May 2018) was a British television and cinema character actor, who came to national prominence for his portrayal of the barman Dave Harris in the 1970s–1990s British television comedy-drama Minder.

Early life
Edwards was born in Penang, Peninsular Malaysia, on 2 February 1931. His father, who spent little time with his son, was a rubber planter at the time of his birth and died in 1946. His mother died shortly after his birth and he was raised first by his grandparents in Southsea, Hampshire, and then by his father and stepmother, who ran a pub in Salisbury, Wiltshire.   
 
He received his early formal education at Clayesmore School in Dorset. In his childhood he read Arthur Ransome's adventure novel Swallows and Amazons, which gave him a life-long passion for river-boating, which began with sailing expeditions along the River Avon in his tenth year.

As a teenager he was an amateur actor, before going to Trinidad where he worked first as a sugar farmer, but having decided that his father's life of plantation farming wasn't for him, he found employment as assistant stage manager and compere of calypso shows for tourists. After returning to England he spent a year at the Royal Central School of Speech & Drama in London, and was then hired as a stage manager at the King's Theatre in Gainsborough, Lincolnshire.

Career
Edwards trained professionally as an actor with Joan Littlewood's Theatre Workshopat the Theatre Royal, Stratford East, appearing in its productions of The Good Soldier Švejk and two plays by Brendan Behan, The Quare Fellow and The Hostage, all of which transferred from the Theatre Royal Stratford East to the West End. He also appeared in that company's production of Lionel Bart's musical version of Frank Norman's play Fings Ain't Wot They Used T'Be, opposite Miriam Karlin and Barbara Windsor. He had been spotted by Littlewood herself, who had been in the audience at one of the performances of a successful play he had produced entitled The Call of the Flesh, which featured Yootha Joyce in an early role.

In 1964 he appeared in the role of Corporal William Allen, V.C. in Cy Endfield's cinema film Zulu, having opted for the part over another offer of a role in Joan Littlewood's stage show Oh! What a Lovely War. He later said: "I earned 10 times as much money from (later in his career) advertising Bran Flakes as I did from the movie Zulu."

From the 1970s to the 1990s, he played the role of Dave Harris, the part-owner and barman of the Winchester Club in ten series of the ITV hit drama Minder. 
 
He also appeared in bit parts in numerous British television shows in the 1970s and '80s, including Callan, The Professionals, Public Eye, Spindoe, Steptoe and Son, Some Mothers Do 'Ave 'Em, Dixon of Dock Green, Man About the House, Softly, Softly and The Saint.  
 
He was a regular in two series of the ITV legal drama The Main Chance (1972, 1975). He played supporting roles in the cinema films Robbery (1967), and the criminal underworld film Get Carter (1971).

During his career Edwards played a number of sinister characters, particularly that of 'Mr Dix', a schoolteacher in the early-1970s sitcom Please Sir!, and a menacing gamekeeper in ITV's Thriller (1973), and was often cast either as policemen or criminals.

In 1985, he appeared in the rock music band Marillion's music video for its single release "Heart of Lothian", in which he played a barman, and starred in a popular TV commercial for McVitie's rich tea biscuits as "Jacko", saying, "Yeah, I'll make a statement. A drink's too wet without one!"

Personal life
His first wife was the actress Yootha Joyce, who also trained at Joan Littlewood's Theatre Workshop. They were married from 1956 to 1969. After their divorce, he married the former Benny Hill Show performer Christine Pilgrim, the marriage producing a son, Thomas (b. 1971). From the 1980s, he was married to Valerie Edwards.

Edwards retained a lifelong interest in river boating, owning several vessels, and during the 1980s and 1990s he resided on a 40 ft-long canal boat converted into a houseboat, named "Winchester" after the fictional private members' bar that he had run in the Minder television series, which was permanently moored on the south bank of the River Thames, at Thames Ditton and Surbiton.

Edwards retired from acting following the end of Minder in 1994, and in his final years divided his time between living in Spain and Scotland.

Death
Edwards died at his home in Santa Pola, Spain, on 23 May 2018 at the age of 87.

Filmography

Film

Television

References

External links
 Interview with Glynn Edwards, minder.org, December 2007. 
 

1931 births
2018 deaths
English male film actors
English male stage actors
English male television actors
People educated at Clayesmore School
People from Penang